Monticello Regional Airport , formerly known as Monticello Municipal Airport, is a public airport located two miles (3 km) southeast of the central business district of Monticello, a city in Jones County, Iowa, United States. It is owned by the City of Monticello.

Facilities and aircraft 
For the 12-month period ending May 15, 2013, the airport had 10,850 general aviation aircraft operations, an average of 30 per day. In September 2016, there were 34 aircraft based at this airport: 27 single-engine, 5 multi-engine and 2 ultra-light.

Accidents and incidents
 On July 1, 2017, a small plane with a single passenger crashed in a cornfield approximately 50 yards from the airport runway, causing the death of the pilot.

References

External links 
 Monticello Regional Airport (MXO) at Iowa DOT Airport Directory
 Aerial photo at Bing Maps

Airports in Iowa
Transportation buildings and structures in Jones County, Iowa